Joseph S. Saladino (born March 28, 1961) is an American politician. He is the current Supervisor of the Town of Oyster Bay in Nassau County, New York. Saladino previously served as a member of the New York Assembly. He is a Republican.

Early life and career
Saladino was born in Massapequa, New York in the year 1961, and he graduated from Massapequa High School in 1979. His mother, Jessie Saladino, was a teacher, and his father was the late Joseph J. Saladino, a former New York Supreme Court Justice. He attended Tulane University and the New York Institute of Technology; he received a masters degree in broadcast journalism from the latter. He graduated summa cum laude.

After graduating, he worked in journalism for six years. Some places he worked at included WNYG (AM) and News 12 Long Island. He also had a brief stint working for the Town of Hempstead and Town of Oyster Bay as an assistant.

New York Assembly
After Steven L. Labriola was elected Town Clerk of Oyster Bay, on March 14, 2004, Saladino was elected defeating his Democratic candidate William R. Funk. He won later that year in the general election with about the same percentage, against the same person. He won every election since with at least 2/3 of the vote.  After representing Assembly District 12, he was redistricted into District 9 in 2012 and was elected to represent that district.

In the State Assembly, he was a strong advocate for the passing of Megan's Law in New York, and introduced bills related to drug abuse prevention. He also was a big environmental advocate, pushing to clean up Grumman headquarters, which has contaminated area drinking water.

Town Supervisor 
After John Venditto resigned because he was facing federal corruption charges, the Town Board voted near-unanimously to appoint him as Town Supervisor. He was sworn in by State Supreme Court Judge Stephen Bucaria on January 31, 2017, and he immediately changed leadership around the executive. Within the first month of being appointed, he merged the sanitation, recycling, engineering, highway, vehicle maintenance departments to form the Department of Public Works, reorganized the building department to increase efficiency, and created a Board of Ethics. In the 2018 budget, he lowered spending, slashed the debt, and cut property taxes, something he has wanted done in the state government as well.

He won his first election as Supervisor in November 2017 with just under 52% of the vote in a five-way election, and in 2019 he received 58% of the vote, against his Town Clerk, James Altadonna, Jr.

Personal life 
Saladino has never been married, nor has any children. He claims this allows him to focus more on his job and improving the Town. His parents, both Italians, are both deceased, and he has one brother, James, who lives in Wading River, New York, and a sister, Virginia, who lives in Massapequa. Combined, James and Virginia have 8 children.

Saladino has lived in Massapequa his entire life.

References

External links
New York State Assembly – Joseph Saladino
Town of Oyster Bay - Joseph Saladino

Republican Party members of the New York State Assembly
1960s births
Living people
American people of Italian descent
New York Institute of Technology alumni
People from Massapequa, New York
21st-century American politicians
Massapequa High School alumni